Henry Bradshaw or Harry Bradshaw may refer to:

Henry Bradshaw (poet) (c. 1450–1513), English poet
Henry Bradshaw (scholar) (1831–1886), British scholar and librarian
Harry Bradshaw (football manager) (c. 1854–1924), English football manager
Harry Bradshaw (footballer, born 1873) (1873–1899), England international footballer
Harry Bradshaw (footballer, born 1895), football goalkeeper
Harry Bradshaw (footballer, born 1896) (1896–1967), English footballer
Harry Bradshaw (golfer) (1913–1990), Irish professional golfer
Harry Bradshaw (rugby league), rugby league footballer who played in the 1950s for England, Dewsbury, and Huddersfield
Harry Bradshaw (rugby) (1868–1910), rugby union and rugby league footballer who played in the 1890s
Henry Bradshaw (jurist), Chief Baron of the Exchequer of England in 1552